D notation or D-notation may refer to:

 D notation (computing), scientific notation for double precision numbers in some versions of FORTRAN and BASIC
 Dice notation, dice algebra in gaming